Daniel Vacek may refer to:

 Dan Vacek (born 1961), American marijuana rights activist
 Daniel Vacek (born 1971), Czech tennis player